Onze Bravos do Malembo is an Angolan football club based in the town of Malembo, Cabinda Province, Angola.

The women's team was several times provincial champion of Cabinda.

They played in the Angolan women's national championship, held from December 13 to 21, 2008, in Luena, Moxico Province, and placed 4th among twelve teams.

References

Football clubs in Angola
Year of establishment missing